This article lists the heads of state of Yugoslavia from the creation of the Kingdom of Serbs, Croats and Slovenes (Kingdom of Yugoslavia) in 1918 until the breakup of the Socialist Federal Republic of Yugoslavia in 1992.

The Kingdom of Yugoslavia was a hereditary monarchy ruled by the House of Karađorđević from 1918 up until World War II. After the war, SFR Yugoslavia was headed first by Ivan Ribar, the President of the Presidency of the National Assembly (the parliamentary speaker), and then by President Josip Broz Tito from 1953 up until his death in 1980. Afterwards, the Presidency of Yugoslavia assumed the role of a collective head of state, with the title of President of the Presidency of Yugoslavia rotating among the representatives of the republics and autonomous provinces that composed the Presidency. However, until 1990 the position of President of the League of Communists of Yugoslavia was usually the most powerful position, most often coinciding with the President of the Presidency. With the introduction of multi-party system in 1990, individual republics elected their own heads of state, but the country's head of state continued to rotate among appointed representatives of republics and autonomous provinces until the country dissolved two years later.

Kingdom of Yugoslavia

The Kingdom of Serbs, Croats and Slovenes was created by the unification of the Kingdom of Serbia (the Kingdom of Montenegro had united with Serbia five days previously, while the regions of Kosovo, Vojvodina and Vardar Macedonia were parts of Serbia prior to the unification) and the provisional State of Slovenes, Croats and Serbs (itself formed from territories of the former Austria-Hungary) on 1 December 1918.

Until 6 January 1929, the Kingdom of Serbs, Croats and Slovenes was a parliamentary monarchy. On that day, King Alexander abolished the Vidovdan Constitution (adopted in 1921), prorogued the National Assembly and introduced a personal dictatorship (so-called 6 January Dictatorship). He officially renamed the country Kingdom of Yugoslavia on 3 October 1929 and, although granted the 1931 Constitution, continued to rule as a de facto absolute monarch until his assassination on 9 October 1934, during a state visit to France. After his assassination, parliamentary monarchy was put back in place.

The Kingdom of Yugoslavia was defeated and occupied on 17 April 1941 after the German invasion. The monarchy was formally abolished and the republic proclaimed on 29 November 1945.

All monarchs were members of the Karađorđević dynasty. Peter I, previously King of Serbia (since the May Coup in 1903 against the Obrenović dynasty), was proclaimed King by representatives of South Slav states. The royal family continued through his son (Alexander I) and his grandson (Peter II).

List

SFR Yugoslavia

After the German invasion and fragmentation of the Kingdom of Yugoslavia, partisans formed the Anti-Fascist Council for the National Liberation of Yugoslavia (AVNOJ) in 1942. On 29 November 1943 an AVNOJ conference proclaimed the Democratic Federal Yugoslavia, while negotiations with the royal government in exile continued. After the liberation of Belgrade on 20 October 1944, the Communist-led government on 29 November 1945 declared King Peter II deposed and proclaimed the Federal People's Republic of Yugoslavia.

From 1945 to 1953, the President of the Presidency of the National Assembly was the office of the Yugoslav head of state. The post was held by Ivan Ribar.

From 1953 to 1963, Josip Broz Tito simultaneously held the offices of the President of the Republic (head of state) and the President of the Federal Executive Council (head of government). The 1963 Constitution renamed the state as Socialist Federal Republic of Yugoslavia, and divided the office of the President of the Republic from that of President of the Federal Council, even if the President of the Republic retained the power to preside over the Government when it met, on the French model.

The 1974 Constitution provided for a collective federal presidency, consisting of representatives of the six republics, the two autonomous provinces within Serbia and (until 1988) the President of the League of Communists, with a chairman in rotation. Notwithstanding, this constitutional provision was suspended because Tito was elected by parliament as President for Life, who thus chaired the collective presidency on a permanent basis. After his death in 1980, one member was annually elected President of the Presidency and performed many of the personal duties expected of a president, though the collective presidency as a whole remained head of state.

List

Timeline

See also
 List of deputy heads of state of Yugoslavia
 Prime Minister of Yugoslavia
 President of the League of Communists of Yugoslavia
 President of Serbia and Montenegro
 Presidency of Bosnia and Herzegovina
 Chairman of the Presidency of Bosnia and Herzegovina
 President of Croatia
 List of presidents of Croatia
 President of the Republic of Macedonia
 President of Montenegro
 List of presidents of Montenegro
 List of heads of state of Montenegro
 President of Serbia
 List of presidents of Serbia
 List of heads of state of Serbia
 President of Slovenia

References

Yugoslavia
Heads of state
 
Heads of state
1918 establishments in Yugoslavia
1992 disestablishments in Yugoslavia